Zarafshon is a city in the center of Uzbekistan's Navoiy Region. Administratively, it is a district-level city, that includes the urban-type settlement Muruntau. Located in the Kyzylkum desert, it receives water from the Amudarya by a 220-km pipeline.

Zarafshon is called "the gold capital of Uzbekistan". It is home of the Navoi Mining & Metallurgy Combinat's Central Mining Administration, charged with mining and processing gold from the nearby Muruntau open-pit mine. Between 1995 and 2006 the Muruntau gold mining and processing operation was run by the Zarafshan-Newmont Joint Venture, a foreign direct investment by Newmont Mining Corporation of Denver, Colorado (at the time the largest U.S. investor in Uzbekistan - it was also the first major Western investment in the region since the breakup of the Soviet Union). Uzbekistan expropriated the company's assets in 2006 and by 2007 had taken full ownership of the mine.

Zarafshan Airport  is served by Uzbekistan Airlines with direct daily flights to and from Tashkent.

References

Populated places in Navoiy Region
Cities in Uzbekistan